Jan Wacław Zawadowski, pseudonym Zawado, (1891–1982) was a Polish painter, author of landscapes (mainly of Provence), still life compositions, portraits, figural scenes. He was a brother of Witold Eugeniusz and pupil of Józef Pankiewicz. Co-founder of the Cercle des Artistes Polonais in Paris.

Zawadowski was influenced mainly by post-impressionism.

Biography
Jan-Waclaw Zawadowksi, also known as ZAWADO, was born on 14 April 1891 in Volhynie (Russian Poland), he is very close of the post-impressionism style.
 
When he was 13, the young Waclaw Zawadowski discovered French paintings. In 1910 he began to study at the Fine Art School of Cracovie in professor Józef Pankiewicz's studio. In 1912 Józef encouraged Zawadowski to go to Paris. After a brief stay in « La Ruche » (an artist's residence) he moved in Montmartre. Then, he became one of the actors of the artistic community of Montparnasse. He signs his first and last contract of exclusivity with a German art dealer : Paul Cassirer, who organized many expositions in Germany. During the war, Zawado go to Spain for four years, mostly in Madrid where he meets his friends, also Polish painters and Arthur Rubinstein.
 
In 1919, when the war is over, he can then go back to Paris. In 1920, Modigliani just died and Zawado move in his studio. During the summer, mostly with other artists, Zawado go to their favorite destinations : Saint-Cirq Lapopie, in Collioure with Foujita, in Sanary or in Le Blanc with Soutine, and also in Bretagne where he paint landscapes.
 
Very tied with Leopold Zborowski, one of the greatest modern art dealer (for example he worked with Modigliani) Zawado gave him to sale his paintings. It's Zborowski who ask him to signed his paintings « Zawado » instead of « Zawadowski ». In 1928, he enter into the « Circle of Polish artists in Paris ». Between 1920 and 1930 he took part at the artistic life of the first School of Paris. He speaks to many writers, musicians and of course painters. He exhibited in Poland, in Paris (Benezit's Gallery) and in London. In 1930 Zawado starts his stays in Aix-en-Provence. In 1938 he take the direction of the Polish Institut of Fine Arts in Paris.
 
In 1945 he stay definitively in Aix but still keep a studio in Paris. Being in the south without other painter's influences made him grow his very own style. His paintings now reflect the very particular light of the south of France.
 
During the 60s his first solo exhibitions starts in Aix, specially in Gallery Spinazzola. From now on Zawado mostly exhibited in the south of France. However a great retrospective took place in Cracovie in 1975, followed by a personal show in 1976 in New-York. It's therefore a whole world made of writers, musicians and painters who starts to visit him.
 
On 15 November 1982 Zawado died at his property in Provence.

References

 
 
Official site: www.zawado.net

External links
 Official website

1891 births
1982 deaths
20th-century Polish painters
20th-century Polish male artists
Post-impressionist painters
Polish landscape painters
Polish male painters